Kathy Guadagnino (born March 20, 1961) is an American professional golfer. Up to 1987, she played under her maiden name of Kathy Baker.

Career
She was born in Albany, New York. She attended the University of Tulsa and South Florida Bible College & Theological Seminary and was the low amateur at the 1983 Nabisco Dinah Shore. In 1982, while attending Tulsa, Guadagnino won the inaugural NCAA individual title, while leading her team to both the AIAW and NCAA national titles.

She joined the LPGA Tour and in 1985, she was a surprise winner of the U.S. Women's Open at Baltusrol Golf Club. Guadagnino's only other LPGA Tour title came at the Konica San Jose Classic in 1988. Her best money list finish was 13th in 1985; she retired from the tour after the 1999 season.

Amateur wins
this list may be incomplete
1980 Women's Western Amateur
1982 NCAA individual championship

Professional wins

LPGA Tour wins (2)

Major championships

Wins (1)

U.S. national team appearances
Amateur
Curtis Cup: 1982 (winners)
Espirito Santo Trophy: 1982 (winners)

References

External links

American female golfers
Tulsa Golden Hurricane women's golfers
LPGA Tour golfers
Winners of LPGA major golf championships
Golfers from New York (state)
Sportspeople from Albany, New York
1961 births
Living people